The Space Coast Next Generation Solar Energy Center is a 10 megawatt (MW) solar photovoltaic (PV) facility at the Kennedy Space Center, Florida.  Commissioned in April 2010, the center is the result of a partnership between NASA and Florida Power & Light.  The facility has approximately 35,000 solar photovoltaic panels from SunPower covering an area of 60 acres. The facility provides slightly less than one percent of the power needed to keep Kennedy Space Center up and running.

A 1 MW solar photovoltaic array is also located at the Kennedy Space Center. 

The Space Coast Next Generation Solar Energy Center was the second largest-scale solar facility in Florida, with the 25 MW DeSoto Next Generation Solar Energy Center being the largest, until the construction of the 75 MW Martin Next Generation Solar Energy Center.

Production

See also

Copper Mountain Solar Facility
List of photovoltaic power stations
Renewable energy in the United States
Renewable portfolio standard
Solar power in the United States

References

Buildings and structures in Merritt Island, Florida
NextEra Energy
NASA
Photovoltaic power stations in the United States
Kennedy Space Center